Jean Richard may refer to:

Full name
 Jean Michel Claude Richard (1787–1868), French botanist
 Jean Richard (actor), French actor and comedian
 Jean Richard (historian) (1921–2021), French historian

Given name
 Jean-Richard Bloch (1884–1947), French critic, novelist and playwright
 Jean-Richard Germont (born ]1945), French former sports shooter
 Jean-Richard Geurts (born 1957), also known under his pseudonym Janry, Belgian comics artist

See also
 Richard (surname)